Louise Funk (February 9, 1900 - July 27, 1986) was born in Van Buren, Arkansas to R. W. and Trimmier Sloan Funk and moved to Shawnee, Oklahoma with her family a year later.  As a young girl she received art lessons from Marjorie Dodge Tapp.  After graduating from Shawnee High School, she continued her art lessons at Columbia University and the Chicago Art Institute.  After returning to Shawnee, she married George Fluke on December 18, 1924.

While sewing her own wedding gown, she learned that the state organization of the Daughters of the American Revolution (DAR) had announced a contest to design a new state flag. Her fiance encouraged her to take the time to enter the contest. She took three weeks to study artifacts at the Oklahoma Historical Society, and entered five different designs. The DAR judges picked one of hers as the winner. The legislature approved her Flag of Oklahoma on March 25, 1926.

Fluke died of pneumonia in July 1986, at the age of 86.

On April 2, 2005, the 80th anniversary of this version of the flag flying above the state capitol, the descendants of Mrs. Fluke presented the Oklahoma Senate with an original large silk flag that was both sewn and painted by hand. Louise Fluke had signed the banner; her signature is quite visible on the right-hand side below the shield. The flag has been treated and mounted in a pressurized gilt frame.

IN July, 1925, the Flukes moved to Ponca City, Oklahoma. She continued living there even after her husband died in 1953. She survived an automobile accident that claimed the life of her husband. She raised their son, who was also named George. She worked as a substitute art teacher in the Ponca City public schools, served as President of the Twentieth Century Club and was a regent of the DAR. In 1982, her activities were recognized with the Pioneer Woman Award by Governor George Nigh at the Marland Mansion Renaissance Ball.

Louise died July 27, 1986. She was buried at Fairview Cemetery in Shawnee, Oklahoma with her parents and her husband George.

See also
 Flag of Oklahoma

References

1986 deaths
1900 births
People from Shawnee, Oklahoma
People from Ponca City, Oklahoma
Artists from Oklahoma
Deaths from pneumonia in Oklahoma
Flag designers